Kappalur is a suburban area in Madurai district of Tamil Nadu, India.

Kappalur's pin code is 625008.

Basic Information
Kappalur Local Administration is situated in Tirumangalam Circle in the district of Madurai. Kappalur has a Toll Plaza. Proposed AIIMS hospital site is located nearby. The government has created Utchapatti-Thoppur satellite Township in Kappalur. Kappalur SIDCO (Small Industries Development Corporation Ltd.) Industrial estate has many polymer and houseware manufacturing units, industrial engineering service units, etc.

Real estate is picking limits in next 5 years.

Kappalur has become the next emerging business hub for automotive industries such as KUN BMW, Isuzu, Volkswagen, Toyota, Mahindra, Tata, Maruti Suzuki, Mitsubishi and Ashok Leyland.

Villages in Madurai district